Zoran Nižić (born 11 October 1989) is a Croatian football player who plays as centre back with FC Akhmat Grozny in the Russian Premier League.

Club career
Nižić started his career at his hometown club HNK Zmaj Makarska, establishing himself early as a first team member at the Treća HNL Jug club. He secured himself a transfer abroad in 2009, aged just 19, to the Belgian Second Division side FC Brussels, where he would spend the next 3 seasons as a starter. After his contract ran out, Nižić returned to Croatia and trained for a few months with HNK Hajduk Split, before signing with them in late 2012. He made his league debut for Hajduk on 16 February 2013, entering the game for the injured Matej Jonjić in a 2–0 away win against NK Slaven Belupo.

In June 2018, Nižić was named in the Prva HNL team of the season for 2017–18.

In August 2018, Nižić refused to play for Hajduk in both League and European matches, allegedly due to a fever; it was later revealed that Nižić refused to play for the squad due to frustrations towards the club management and its transfer policy towards him and the players. It was also revealed that he had a confrontation with a director of Hajduk, Saša Bjelanović, in the locker room, who eventually took away his role as a captain. He was later transfer-listed by request.

On 27 August 2018, he signed a 3-year contract with the Russian Premier League club FC Akhmat Grozny.

International career
Nižić made his debut for Croatia in a May 2017 friendly match against Mexico in Los Angeles and earned a total of 2 caps, scoring no goals. His second and final international was a March 2018 friendly, also against Mexico.

In May 2018 he was named in Croatia's preliminary 32 man squad for the 2018 World Cup in Russia but did not make the final 23.

Career statistics

References

External links
 

1989 births
Living people
Footballers from Split, Croatia
Association football central defenders
Croatian footballers
Croatia international footballers
R.W.D.M. Brussels F.C. players
HNK Hajduk Split players
FC Akhmat Grozny players
Challenger Pro League players
Croatian Football League players
Russian Premier League players
Croatian expatriate footballers
Expatriate footballers in Belgium
Croatian expatriate sportspeople in Belgium
Expatriate footballers in Russia
Croatian expatriate sportspeople in Russia